Simeon Chamov (born 24 December 1990) is a Bulgarian boxer. He competed in the welterweight division at the 2016 Summer Olympics, but was eliminated in the second bout. His father is a former international boxer.

References

External links

 

1990 births
Living people
Bulgarian male boxers
Olympic boxers of Bulgaria
Boxers at the 2016 Summer Olympics
Place of birth missing (living people)
European Games competitors for Bulgaria
Boxers at the 2015 European Games
Welterweight boxers